The National Party (Polish: Stronnictwo Narodowe (SN)) – is a political party in Poland which was reactivated in 1989 in Warsaw by Jan Ostoja Matłachowski, Leon Mirecki, Maciej Giertych, Bogusław Jeznach, Bogusław Rybicki and others as the successor to the pre-war National Party. Its first chairman was Stefan Jarzębski. The re-activated SN was officially registered on 21 August 1990.

The party adheres to the tradition of endecja, mainly the ideas of Roman Dmowski. The party opposed Poland's membership in the EU and NATO.

In the Polish parliamentary election 1991, the party won 74 082 votes, i.e. 0,66%.

In 1992, the party underwent a split, as one faction led by Bogusław Rybicki formed the Stronnictwo Narodowe “Ojczyzna” (National Party “Fatherland”), which advocated anti-Semitic and anti-German views.

Most of its members eventually entered the League of Polish Families (LPR) and dissolved the National Party in 2001.

See also
National Democracy (Poland) - the historical National party

References

1989 establishments in Poland
2001 disestablishments in Poland
Conservative parties in Poland
Defunct political parties in Poland
Eurosceptic parties in Poland
National Democracy
Nationalist parties in Poland
Polish nationalist parties
Political parties disestablished in 2001
Political parties established in 1989